The 2019–20 season was the 3rd season of Juventus and the club's 3rd consecutive season in the top flight of Italian women's football. In addition to the domestic league, Juventus participated in this season's editions of the Coppa Italia, the Supercoppa Italiana, and the UEFA Champions League. Due to the COVID-19 pandemic in Italy, the season was terminated on 8 June 2020, and on 25 June, Juventus was awarded with the league championship title by the Italian Football Federation (FIGC) having been the unbeaten first placed team in the competition until the lockdown.

Players

Serie A

Coppa Italia

Champions League

Supercoppa Italiana

See also 
 2019–20 Juventus F.C. season
 2019–20 Juventus F.C. Under-23 season

Notes

References 

Juventus F.C. (women) seasons
Juventus